Finland competed at the 1968 Summer Olympics in Mexico City, Mexico. 66 competitors, 60 men and 6 women, took part in 61 events in 13 sports.

Medalists

Gold
 Kaarlo Kangasniemi — Weightlifting, Men's Middle Heavyweight

Silver
 Jorma Kinnunen — Athletics, Men's Javelin Throw
 Olli Laiho — Gymnastics, Men's Pommeled Horse

Bronze
 Arto Nilsson — Boxing, Men's Light Welterweight

Athletics

Boxing

Canoeing

Cycling

Four cyclists represented Finland in 1968.

Individual road race
 Raimo Honkanen
 Mauno Uusivirta
 Ole Wackström
 Raimo Suikkanen

Team time trial
 Mauno Uusivirta
 Ole Wackström
 Raimo Honkanen
 Raimo Suikkanen

1000m time trial
 Raimo Suikkanen

Individual pursuit
 Ole Wackström

Diving

Gymnastics

Modern pentathlon

Three male pentathletes represented Finland in 1968.

Individual:
 Seppo Aho - 4497 points (18th place)
 Martti Ketelä - 4446 points (20th place)
 Jorma Hotanen - 4231 points (34th place)

Team:
 Aho, Ketelä, and Hotanen - 13238 points (5th place)

Rowing

Sailing

Shooting

Nine shooters, all men, represented Finland in 1968.

25 m pistol
 Pentti Linnosvuo
 Immo Huhtinen

50 m pistol
 Matti Patteri
 Seppo Saarenpää

300 m rifle, three positions
 Juhani Laakso
 Osmo Ala-Honkola

50 m rifle, three positions
 Simo Morri
 Jaakko Minkkinen

50 m rifle, prone
 Jaakko Minkkinen
 Simo Morri

Skeet
 Tuukka Mäkelä

Swimming

Weightlifting

Wrestling

See also
 Finland at the 1968 Summer Paralympics

References

Nations at the 1968 Summer Olympics
1968
1968 in Finnish sport